This is a list of transfers in Dutch football for the 2012 Summer transfer window. Only moves featuring an Eredivisie side are listed.

The summer transfer window will open on July 1, 2012, and will close on August 31. Deals may be signed at any given moment in the season, but the actual transfer may only take place during the transfer window. Unattached players may sign at any moment.

Notes
 Transfer will take place on 1 July 2012.

References

Football transfers summer 12
2012
Dutch